Marcel Cummings-Toone (born 17 July 1984) is a former New Zealand rugby union player. His regular playing position was hooker. He was a part of the Chiefs Super Rugby squad in 2012 where he made one appearance off the bench against the Brumbies in Mount Maunganui. During his two seasons with Waikato he played 17 games and scored 3 tries, he captained Waikato in their 2012 win over his old side Bay of Plenty and scored the first try in the Mooloos successful Ranfurly Shield challenge.

External links 
 Chiefs Player Profile
 Waikato Player Profile
 Yahoo Profile

Living people
1984 births
New Zealand rugby union players
Chiefs (rugby union) players
Waikato rugby union players
Bay of Plenty rugby union players
Canterbury rugby union players
Rugby union hookers
Rugby union players from Christchurch
People educated at Shirley Boys' High School